This is a list of Speedy Gonzales cartoons.

Cartoons

1953 

 Cat-Tails for Two (prototype) (August 29, 1953) (MM, Robert McKimson)

1955 

 Speedy Gonzales (official) - Starring Sylvester. (September 17, 1955) (MM, Friz Freleng). Won the Academy Award for Best Short Film (Cartoon).

1957 

 Tabasco Road (July 20, 1957) (LT, Robert McKimson). Nominated for an Academy Award for Best Short Film (Cartoon). 
 Gonzales' Tamales (November 30, 1957) - Starring Sylvester. (LT, Friz Freleng)

1958 

 Tortilla Flaps (January 18, 1958) (LT, Robert McKimson)

1959 

 Mexicali Shmoes (July 4, 1959) (LT, Friz Freleng). Nominated for an Academy Award for Best Short Film (Cartoon).  
 Here Today, Gone Tamale (August 29, 1959) - Starring Sylvester. (LT, Friz Freleng)

1960 

 West of the Pesos (January 23, 1960) - Starring Sylvester. (MM, Robert McKimson)

1961 

All cartoons co-star Sylvester.
 Cannery Woe (January 7, 1961) (LT, Robert McKimson)
 The Pied Piper of Guadalupe (August 19, 1961) (LT, Friz Freleng). Nominated for an Academy Award for Best Short Film (Cartoon).

1962 

 Mexican Boarders (May 12, 1962) - Starring Sylvester. (LT, Friz Freleng)

1963 

All cartoons co-star Sylvester.
 Mexican Cat Dance (April 20, 1963) (LT, Friz Freleng)
 Chili Weather (August 17, 1963) (MM, Friz Freleng)

1964
 A Message to Gracias (February 8, 1964) - Starring Sylvester. (LT, Robert McKimson)
 Nuts and Volts (April 25, 1964) - Starring Sylvester. (LT, Friz Freleng)
 Pancho's Hideaway (October 24, 1964) (LT, Friz Freleng)
 Road to Andalay (December 26, 1964) - Starring Sylvester. (MM, Friz Freleng)

1965 

 It's Nice to Have a Mouse Around the House (January 16, 1965) - Starring Granny, Sylvester, Daffy. (LT, Friz Freleng)
 Cats and Bruises (January 30, 1965) - Starring Sylvester. (MM, Friz Freleng)
 The Wild Chase (February 27, 1965) - Starring Sylvester; the only Speedy Gonzales cartoon to also feature Wile E. Coyote and the Road Runner. (MM, Friz Freleng)
 Moby Duck (March 27, 1965) - Starring Daffy. (LT, Robert McKimson)
 Assault and Peppered (April 24, 1965) - Starring Daffy. (MM, Robert McKimson)
 Well Worn Daffy (May 22, 1965) - Starring Daffy. (LT, Robert McKimson)
 Chili Corn Corny (October 23, 1965) - Starring Daffy. (LT, Robert McKimson)
 Go Go Amigo (November 20, 1965) - Starring Daffy. (MM, Robert McKimson)

1966 

All cartoons co-star Daffy and were directed by Robert McKimson.
 The Astroduck (January 1, 1966) (LT)
 Mucho Locos (February 5, 1966) (MM)
 Mexican Mousepiece (February 26, 1966) (MM)
 Daffy Rents (March 26, 1966) (LT)
 A-Haunting We Will Go (April 16, 1966) (LT) - Starring Witch Hazel. 
 Snow Excuse (May 21, 1966) (MM)
 A Squeak in the Deep (July 19, 1966) (LT)
 Feather Finger (August 20, 1966) (MM)
 Swing Ding Amigo (September 17, 1966) (LT)
 A Taste of Catnip (December 3, 1966) (MM) - Starring Sylvester (cameo)

1967 

All cartoons co-star Daffy.
 Daffy's Diner (January 21, 1967) (MM, Robert McKimson)
 Quacker Tracker (April 29, 1967) (LT, Rudy Larriva)
 The Music Mice-Tro (May 27, 1967) (MM, Rudy Larriva)
 The Spy Swatter (June 24, 1967) (LT, Rudy Larriva)
 Speedy Ghost to Town (July 29, 1967) (MM, Alex Lovy)
 Rodent to Stardom (September 23, 1967) (LT, Alex Lovy)
 Go Away Stowaway (September 30, 1967) (MM, Alex Lovy)
 Fiesta Fiasco (December 9, 1967) (LT, Alex Lovy)

1968 

All cartoons co-star Daffy and were directed by Alex Lovy.
 Skyscraper Caper (March 9, 1968) (LT)
 See Ya Later Gladiator (June 29, 1968) (LT)

Post-Golden Age cartoons featuring Speedy Gonzales

1979 
The Fright Before Christmas (cameo)

1980 
 The Chocolate Chase - Starring Daffy

2000 
 Tweety's High-Flying Adventure (direct-to-video feature film; cameo)

2003 
 Looney Tunes: Back in Action (feature film; cameo)

2015 
 Looney Tunes: Rabbits Run (direct-to-video feature film)

2021 
 Space Jam: A New Legacy (feature film)

References

Speedy Gonzales